Xingning may refer to:

Xingning, Guangdong, county-level city
 Xingning, Zixing (兴宁镇), a town of Zixing City, Hunan.
Xingning Academy, ancient structure in Xingning, Guangdong
Xingning Basin, located around Xingning, Guangdong
Xingning District, Nanning, Guangxi
Xingning era (363–365 CE), era name of the Emperor Ai of Jin